Hadoar (Hebrew: The Post) (1921 - 2005)  was a Hebrew language periodical published in the United States by the Histadruth Ivrith of America.

Hadoar  was described by the Jewish Telegraphic Agency as "one of the best Hebrew-language magazines in the world" in its day. It was edited for decades by Hebraist Menachem Ribalow.

History 
Hadoar began in 1921 as a daily newspaper, but switched to weekly publication in 1922.  Hadoar was published in New York and distributed nationwide. Elie Wiesel was the speaker for Hadoar'''s 46th anniversary celebration in 1967. Hadoar'' ceased publication in 2005.

References

Defunct newspapers published in New York (state)
Hebrew-language newspapers published in the United States
1921 establishments in New York (state)
Jewish newspapers published in the United States
Newspapers
Daily newspapers published in New York (state)
Zionism in the United States